The Arabic word insha means "construction", or "creation". It has been used in this sense in classical Arabic literature such as the Quran. Over time it acquired the meaning of composition, especially denoting the prose composition of letters, documents, and state papers. Subsequently, it was used as a synonym of 'Munshaat', which are documents composed in accordance with specific norms of diction and style that distinguish these prose compositions from ordinary prose. Gradually the term "Insha " came to represent a distinct branch of learning that enabled one to discern the merits and defects of the prose composition of letters and documents as a distinct type of writing from regular treatises and books.

"Insha" writing is mainly concerned with the expression of one's innermost feelings, rather than the use of prose in scientific treatises. Insha writing developed into an art form and,involved detailed rules and regulations that a well lettered person was supposed to learn, and  artful and well written epistolography, was considered a form of Adab. The devices employed in Insha include verbal puns, and tricks, riddles, and a mannered , elegant style of writing.  A model of stately Insha prose in Arabic was provided by al-Qadi al-Fadil, (d.1199), and later by al-Qalqashandi (d.1418). In the classical Persian literature, the most representative type  of "Insha is identified as "Rasail", meaning "letters".

Generally "Rasail" literature can be categorized into two types of literature- a.) Tauqi'at and b.) muhawarat. Tauqi'at consists of the orders and directives of rulers and officials, and Muhawarat  consists of letters and correspondence. If the addressee is superior in status then the form of letters are called  Murafa'a, and in case the addressee is inferior in status, then the type of letters are called ruq'a. If both the addressee and the writer are of equal status, then the type of letters are called murasala.

Further categories exist due to the nature of the letters and the relationship and comparative status of the addressee and the writer. for instance if the writer is the ruler of a kingdom, then the Insha issuing from him could be categorized into farman, manshur or fathnama, depending on the nature of its contents.

Medieval India has a very rich tradition of Insha writing. Many intellectuals such as Amir khusrau, Khwaja-i- Jahan Mohammad Gawan and Abul Fazl set a model of Insha writing, which was followed by generations of Insha writers. In admiration of superb Insha writing, many collections of Insha writing were collected. Munshaat -i- Namakin is one of the largest collections of Insha writings, which is dated from the early Mughal period.

References

Sources
 

Arabic literature
Letters (message)
Persian literature